Sun Liqun (15 April 1950 – 10 February 2020) was a Chinese historian who was a professor at Nankai University.

Biography
Sun was born in Tianjin, on April 15, 1950. In 1975, he graduated from Nankai University, where he majored in history. After graduation, he taught at the university. Since 2006, he regularly gave lectures on Chinese historical figures on the television programme Lecture Room shown on CCTV-10. He retired on September 1, 2015. He died of illness on February 10, 2020.

Works

References

1950 births
2020 deaths
People from Tianjin
Chinese historians
Writers from Tianjin
Nankai University alumni
Academic staff of Nankai University